The 1905 New Zealand rugby union tour of Australia was the fifth tour by the New Zealand team to Australia and the first in their own country. Three matches were played against Australian teams and four against provincial sides in New Zealand.

Touring party 
Manager: N. Gallbraith
Captain: Jimmy Hunter

Matches
Complete list of matches played by New Zealand during their tour:

Tour matches

References

New Zealand
New Zealand tour
Tour
New Zealand national rugby union team tours of Australia